Kajillionaire is a 2020 American crime comedy-drama film written and directed by Miranda July (her third feature following Me and You and Everyone We Know and The Future). The film stars Evan Rachel Wood, Debra Winger and Richard Jenkins as members of a petty criminal family whose relationship becomes frayed when a stranger played by Gina Rodriguez joins their schemes.

Kajillionaire had its world premiere at the Sundance Film Festival on January 25, 2020, and was released in theaters on September 25, 2020, followed by video on demand on October 16, 2020, by Focus Features in the United States, and by Universal Pictures internationally.

Plot
An emotionally stunted 26-year-old woman, Old Dolio Dyne, is in a manipulative relationship with her con artist parents, who treat her as an accomplice to their petty thefts and scams rather than as a daughter. The family owes $1,500 of back rent on their apartment in Los Angeles, which is actually a leaking office space attached to a soap factory. Old Dolio concocts a scam in which they will fly to New York City using tickets they won in a contest. Her parents will take her luggage at the baggage claim and Old Dolio will claim the airline has lost it. Old Dolio will then collect on the travel insurance she purchased, which will cover their rent.

After an uneventful trip, Old Dolio and her parents return home. She is surprised to find them chatting with Melanie, a friendly young woman in the seat next to them, and even more surprised when they reveal their scam to Melanie and have her pretend to be their daughter as they pick up the luggage. Old Dolio reports her "lost luggage", but learns it could take six weeks for the check to come, so the family looks for alternative methods to obtain the money.

Melanie proves surprisingly amenable to their way of life and reveals she lied about being a physician's assistant and is actually a clerk at an eyeglass store. She introduces the family to one of her elderly clients, from whom they steal a blank check and cash it for $650. A second client, who is dying, asks the family to pretend to be his family as he passes away. Old Dolio is shaken by the experience and hurt when her parents rush to comfort Melanie while ignoring her. Arriving home, Old Dolio discovers the insurance check in the mail.

Old Dolio's parents try to initiate a threesome with Melanie, but she reacts badly. They are interrupted by Old Dolio, who is heartbroken to hear her mother call Melanie "hon" and offers her mother the entire travel insurance money to do the same to her. Old Dolio's mother refuses, but Melanie accepts Old Dolio's offer and takes her to her apartment. Rather than simply call Old Dolio "hon", Melanie offers a "full-service" treatment fulfilling emotional needs that Old Dolio's parents failed to meet.

Old Dolio's parents turn up at Melanie's apartment, telling Old Dolio they love and miss her and giving her 17 birthday presents, promising the 18th one (though she is 26) at dinner the next night. Old Dolio and Melanie attend the dinner even though they suspect it is another scam. At the restaurant, Old Dolio's parents give her a necklace and swear they will change. They return to Melanie's apartment and tuck Old Dolio into bed. Melanie, who has hidden the insurance money in her fuse box, tells Old Dolio that if her parents have stolen the money they are monsters and do not love her, while Old Dolio says if the money is still there, it is proof her parents have changed. She also comes up with a third possibility: that her parents will have left behind $525, her share of the cash, signifying that they love her but will never ever be able to offer her anything more. To Melanie and Old Dolio's surprise, the cash is all there.

The next morning, Melanie and Old Dolio awaken to find that Melanie has been robbed; all removable objects and furnishings, including the cash in the fuse box, are gone. The only things left are Old Dolio's 17 presents. Realizing they are refundable, Old Dolio and Melanie take them to be returned. The total refund is $485.05, until Melanie realizes they forgot to return Old Dolio's necklace, bringing the total to $525, Old Dolio's share of the insurance money. Old Dolio and Melanie kiss in the store.

Cast

Production
In March 2018, it was announced Miranda July would write and direct the film, with Brad Pitt and Youree Henley producing, under their Plan B Entertainment and Annapurna Pictures banners, respectively. The same month, Evan Rachel Wood, Richard Jenkins, Debra Winger and Gina Rodriguez joined the cast. In June 2018, Mark Ivanir joined the cast. Principal photography began in May 2018.

Release
The film had its world premiere at the Sundance Film Festival on January 25, 2020. Shortly after, A24 was announced to be in negotiations to acquire its distribution rights, but Focus Features acquired the U.S. rights, with Universal Pictures distributing it internationally. It was released in theaters on September 25, 2020, followed by video on demand on October 16, 2020. It was previously scheduled to be released on September 18, 2020, and June 19, 2020.

Reception
The site's critical consensus reads, "Whether you see Kajillionaire as refreshingly unique or simply bizarre will depend on your cinematic adventurousness—and fans of writer-director Miranda July wouldn't have it any other way." On Metacritic, the film has a weighted average score of 78 out of 100, based on reviews from 35 critics, indicating "generally favorable reviews".

Kajillionaire was nominated for a 2021 GLAAD Media Award.

References

External links
 

2020 films
2020 comedy-drama films
2020 crime drama films
2020 independent films
2020 LGBT-related films
2020s American films
2020s crime comedy-drama films
2020s English-language films
2020s heist films
American crime comedy-drama films
American heist films
American independent films
American LGBT-related films
Annapurna Pictures films
Films about con artists
Films about dysfunctional families
Films directed by Miranda July
Films set in Los Angeles
Lesbian-related films
LGBT-related comedy-drama films
Plan B Entertainment films